The 1993–94 season was Burnley's second season in the third tier of English football. They were managed by Jimmy Mullen in his second full season since he replaced Frank Casper during the 1991–1992 campaign.

Appearances and goals

|}

A.  The "Other" column constitutes appearances and goals (including those as a substitute) in the Football League Trophy and play-offs.

Transfers

In

Out

Matches

Football League Second Division
Key

In Result column, Burnley's score shown first
H = Home match
A = Away match

pen. = Penalty kick
o.g. = Own goal

Results

Final league position

Play-Offs

FA Cup

League Cup

Football League Trophy

References

Burnley F.C. seasons
Burnley